was a Japanese photographer.

Like few others, Anzai has documented art from and in Japan in his works. The 2007 retrospective "Anzaï: Personal Photo Archives, 1970–2006" (National Art Center, Tokyo) showed for the first time an unprecedented collection of 37 years of art in Japan. A lone chronicler, Anzai's style of shyly documenting, yet accurately encompassing photographies of art is in itself an object of art. He always includes actual living people in his photographs.

Notes

External links
"Anzaï: Personal Photo Archives 1970–2006". National Art Center, Tokyo.
Corkill, Edan. "Shigeo Anzai: Faces of youthful ambition". Japan Times, 4 October 2007.

Japanese photographers
1939 births
2020 deaths